KET ED, known as the Education Channel, was a digital television programming service operated by PBS member network Kentucky Educational Television. The service provided programming from the Annenberg/CPB project, along with encore presentations of some PBS programming, and much of KET's locally produced in-house instructional television (ITV) productions.

The service originated from KET's studios at the O. Leonard Press Telecommunications Center, at 600 Cooper Drive in Lexington, Kentucky.

History
In the beginning of the 2002–03 school year—which, in Kentucky, began in early August—the Kentucky Educational Television network launched three additional subchannels on the digital companion signals of all fifteen of its principal transmitters. In addition to a simulcast of their analog signals, the digital channels now offered three additional services, including a statewide relaunch of Louisville-based WKMJ-TV’s signal known as KET2. The DT3 and DT4 subchannels were branded as KET3 and KET4, which were the over-the-air relaunches of Star Channels 703 and 704, respectively. KET4 began simulcasting Star Channel 704 in 2003. The Star Channels were KET's direct broadcast satellite channels for schools and libraries launched in 1988 for KET's signature distance learning program.

In early 2002 as a fourth digital subchannel, KET4 began broadcasting a PBS digital sampler channel, mainly broadcasting certain PBS programs with the highest viewership.

KET4's programming lineup mostly consisted of programming from the Annenberg/CPB Channel, along with professional development seminars for educators, along with high school and college telecourses. On weeknights, KET4 also broadcast high-definition television programming from PBS from 8-11 p.m. Eastern time (7-10 p.m. Central time).

KET4 was rebranded as KET ED, also known as the Education Channel, in August 2007, broadcasting over both the DT3 and DT4 subchannels of all fifteen of KET's principal satellite stations. The channel was formed by merging KET3's instructional programming with the Annenberg/CPB project programming on KET4, and consolidating them into one programming lineup. The KET HD schedule remained on the KET ED service until the Kentucky Channel launched on KET's DT3 service in January 2008. When it did so, the HD schedule relocated to the Kentucky Channel feed, and was expanded to include an additional hour of programming. KET ED broadcast a 20-hour long schedule of mainly educational and instructional programming, along with Annenberg channel programming. The subchannel went off the air nightly during the hours that the Kentucky Channel broadcast the PBS HD schedule. Beginning in the 2008-2009 winter season, KET ED ran programming on a 24-hour-a-day basis on the present-day World Channel outlet WKMJ-DT3 in the Louisville area.

KET ED was then discontinued as a linear channel in Fall 2009, thus deleting the DT4 subchannels of all fifteen principal KET stations, but a KET ED programming block began to be broadcast overnights on KET KY for the next three years until the start of the 2012–13 season. KET ED still existed as a video on demand programming service on the network's website, allowing users to stream a limited selection of programming aired on the former television service, most of which is original programming from the network, with some ITV programming from other producers also being offered. This action is somewhat comparable to The WB television network's 2008 relaunch as an online TV network after it went off the air as a result of the September 2006 merger with UPN to form The CW. The KET ED On Demand site was replaced by the KET Education online video library, and the nationwide online service PBS LearningMedia by 2016.

In terms of over-the-air digital broadcasting, after the KET ED channel permanently signed off of the over-the-air signals in Fall 2009, KET would never again broadcast a fourth digital subchannel on its fifteen main transmitters until December 2016, when it was reactivated and broadcasting a test card. The newly revived DT4 subchannel, which briefly revived the KET4 branding, broadcast the SMPTE color bars in the ensuing weeks prior to the launch of a new 24-hour national PBS Kids subchannel, branded as PBS Kids on KET. The new 24/7 PBS Kids began broadcasting on the DT4 subchannel on January 12, 2017 as a soft launch, four days earlier than the specified launch date of January 16.

Programming
 
The Education Channel broadcast a 20-hour schedule daily; it signed off the air at 8 p.m. Eastern Time (7 p.m. Central Time), and signs back on at 12 Midnight Eastern (11 p.m. Central). Unlike KET's other services, during the interstitials, KET ED showed various slides, often accompanied with the network's URL, and a toll-free telephone number, along with a digital clock showing the current time, as opposed to normal network promos, in between programs and/or videos. The on-screen digital clock was also used between programs on all of KET ED's predecessor services.

KET ED and its predecessors were also well-known for broadcasting the network's original instructional television productions and mini-series, as well as the network's Electronic Field Trips series over the 20+ years the services were on the air. The network-produced series, which launched in 1995, were mostly documentaries about mainly historic and/or natural places in Kentucky (i.e. Mammoth Cave National Park, Old Fort Harrod State Park, Fort Boonesborough State Park, Louisville Zoo, southern Indiana’s Falls of the Ohio), but the EFT series also took students (vicariously through video) to farms, museums, the Kentucky Center For the Arts, a dentist’s office, the Louisville National Weather Service forecast office, and even the KET network studio itself.

In addition to Annenberg Channel programming, the service also broadcast original instructional television productions syndicated from varied instructional programming producers such as the Agency for Instructional Technology, and other PBS member networks and/or affiliates, as well as replays of select PBS and PBS Kids programming that could be used for instructional programming. In many instances, select programs on KET ED, especially the network’s instructional mini-series produced for classroom use, were at several occasions aired in multi-hour “block feeds,” bunching several episodes—or in the case of some instructional programs an entire series—into a marathon of a single program. KET ED also broadcast a package of 30 select episodes of Fat Albert and the Cosby Kids that were shortened to 15 minutes each and edited specifically for instructional use.

Availability
From 2007 to 2009, KET ED was broadcast over the fourth digital subchannel of all of KET's fifteen (15) principal broadcast relay stations throughout the network's coverage area, and on WKMJ-DT3/Louisville, serving much of Kentucky and some nearby sections of neighboring states. The channel was also available to several cable television systems throughout the state. After the KET3/KET4 merger in August 2007, KET ED was simulcast over the third digital subchannel until the Kentucky Channel began broadcasting on the DT3 channel in January 2008.

Original affiliates
Unless otherwise specified, these affiliates were silent from 2009 to 2017, and now broadcast the 24-hour PBS Kids channel.

References

External links
KET website (current)

Television networks in the United States
Educational and instructional television channels
English-language television stations in the United States
Internet properties established in 2007
Internet properties disestablished in 2016
Kentucky Educational Television
Public television in the United States
Television channels and stations established in 2007
Television channels and stations disestablished in 2012
Television stations in Kentucky
Defunct mass media in Kentucky